The Tolt River is located in the western foothills of the Cascade Mountains in north central King County in the U.S. state of Washington. The river begins at the confluence of the North Fork Tolt and South Fork Tolt rivers.  It flows southwest joining the Snoqualmie River near Carnation, Washington. The Tolt River watershed is part of the larger Snohomish River and Puget Sound drainage basin.

The South Fork Tolt watershed provides ~30% of the drinking water for Seattle area residents.

Name origin 

The name Tolt comes from the Lushootseed village name tultxʷ or tulq.

See also

List of rivers of Washington

References

External links 

Tolt River Flooding Information
Tolt River Watershed

Rivers of Washington (state)
Rivers of King County, Washington